Alston Town Hall is a municipal building in Front Street, Alston, Cumbria, England. The town hall, which is currently used as a public library, is a Grade II listed building.

History
The construction of the building was an initiative by the locally-born industrial chemist, Hugh Lee Pattinson, to create an events venue in the town. It was built and financed by a specially formed company for which he was one of the largest subscribers. The site chosen was a large rectangular piece of land known as the Vicarage Croft, which was donated to the company by the trustees of Greenwich Hospital.

The foundation stone for the new building was laid by Pattinson in 1857. It was designed by Alfred Burdakin Higham of Newcastle upon Tyne in the Gothic Revival style, built in rubble masonry at a cost of £2,000 and completed in 1858. The design involved an asymmetrical main frontage with five bays facing onto Front Street; the third bay from the left was formed by a four-stage clock tower with an arched doorway in the first stage, a two-light mullioned and transomed window in the second stage, a small rectangular window in the third stage and a square turret with clock faces in the fourth stage: the tower was surmounted by a pyramid-shaped roof. The second and fourth bays were gabled and the fourth bay featured a large four-light mullioned and transomed window with tracery: the window was flanked by niches. Internally, the principal rooms were the main assembly hall, a courtroom, facilities for the local mechanics' institute and a reading room.

Following significant population growth, largely associated with the status of Alston as a market town, the area became an rural district with the town hall as its headquarters in 1894. The town hall continued to serve as the headquarters of the rural district council for much of the 20th century, but ceased to be the local seat of government when the enlarged Eden District Council which was formed in 1974.

The building subsequently became home to the local tourist information office and also accommodated a branch of the Trustee Savings Bank until the late 1980s, while the local public library, which had relocated to the Market Place, returned to the town hall in 2008.

See also
 Listed buildings in Alston Moor

Notes

References

Government buildings completed in 1858
City and town halls in Cumbria
Alston, Cumbria
Grade II listed buildings in Cumbria